The Mawavi Historic District, Chopawamsic RDA Camp 2 near Triangle, Virginia, United States, dates from 1942.  It was listed on the National Register of Historic Places in 1989.

Landscaping and structures were designed by architects of the National Park Service;  construction was done by Civilian Conservation Corps workers.

The  district is within what became the  Prince William Forest Park.

The NRHP listing included 56 contributing buildings, one contributing structure and one other contributing site.

The work was specifically designed by a cooperative effort of the NPS's Branch of
Plans and Design in Washington, D.C., and by the NPS Branch of Planning and State Cooperation,
Region 1, in Richmond.  It included 36 cabins, a dining hall, various other buildings, and a dam that were built during 1936–1938.

The name "Mawavi" is a clipped compound of Maryland, Washington, D.C., and Virginia.

See also
Orenda/SP-26 Historic District, Chopawamsic RDA Camp 3, also NRHP-listed

References

1936 establishments in Virginia
Historic districts in Prince William County, Virginia
Historic districts on the National Register of Historic Places in Virginia
National Register of Historic Places in Prince William County, Virginia
Park buildings and structures on the National Register of Historic Places in Virginia
Prince William Forest Park
National Park Service rustic in Virginia